Mihailo "Miša" Anastasijević (February 24, 1803 – January 27, 1885) was a businessman and the second richest man in Serbia in the 19th century, through his successful salt export from Wallachia and Moldavia and business partnership with Miloš Obrenović I, Prince of Serbia. He was also the Captain of Danube, and acquired significant benefits from Prince Miloš. Anastasijević was the first public benefactor in Serbia and organizer of various balls for the Belgrade bourgeoisie. He was also a philanthropist.

Life
Anastasijević was born in Poreč, modern Donji Milanovac, Serbia in 1803. His father, Anastas, was a landowner and petty businessman. His mother, Ruža, was a homemaker. His father died when he was only two years old, while his mother died as a result of complications during childbirth, leaving his stepmother Milja in charge of him. Miša and Milja twice crossed the Danube into Austria during the First Serbian Uprising of the Serbian Revolution. At 11 years old, due to his literacy, he became a teacher in his hometown. From 1817 to 1822, he worked as a charcoal burner (customs officer and supervisor) before going into trade. 

He was a business partner of Miloš Obrenović I, Prince of Serbia, notably the richest. He was given the title of "Danube Captain" by Prince Miloš, from whom he also acquired significant commercial benefits. His company soon gained control over salt exports from Wallachia and Moldavia. At the top of his career, Miša Anastasijević employed circa 10,000 workers and had a fleet of 80 ships. He was the first public benefactor in Serbia and organizer of various balls for the Belgrade bourgeoisie.

Anastasijević was called the “Prince of Danube” or “Danube Rothschild” for his wealth and business skills. Miša Anastasijević married his daughter Sara (Sarka) to George, a Prince from the ruling Karađorđević family and built the most impressive building in the city (Captain Miša's Mansion), which was supposed to be the new court, although this plan failed. The building has hosted some of the most important educational and cultural institutions of the Principality of Serbia including the Belgrade Higher School, which became the University of Belgrade. Occasionally, its gala hall has been used for the meetings of the National Assembly (1864–1875) and Senate (1901–1903). Today, it is the seat of the Rectorate of the University of Belgrade.

Anastasijević died on January 27, 1885, at his home in Bucharest, Romania. His body is preserved at a church in Clejani, Romania. According to the Romanian newspaper Evenimentul zilei, it is naturally mummified and preserved in a "remarkable" state.

See also 
Captain Miša's Mansion
University of Belgrade
Luka Ćelović
Đorđe Vajfert
Nikola Spasić
Marija Trandafil
 Sava Vukovic (merchant)

References

External links 
 D. Bataković, The Serbian revolution: Nation-Building and Modernization, 2005
 Belgrade - Captain Miša's Building

19th-century Serbian nobility
Serbian businesspeople
Serbian military leaders
1803 births
1885 deaths
Serbian philanthropists
19th-century philanthropists